The Royal Order of Bhutan (Dzongkha:  / , meaning "Heart Son of the Thunder Dragon") is a medal awarded by the King of Bhutan. It was established by Jigme Dorji Wangchuck in 1966 and redesigned in 2008.

Award 
It is awarded to people who had contributed in a variety of ways to the socio-economic, religious and political development and growth of Bhutan.

It can be presented to both Bhutanese citizens and foreign nationals.

Insignia

This order consists of a single class consisting of a neck badge suspended by a collar and matching miniature contained in a fitted case featuring the “cross dorjee and the name of the order in gold block on the lid.

The 65 mm badge consists of a large outer ring with silver crossed dorjees and eight gold lotus petals placed in between, with a red enameled circle within in, inside which a yellow enamel bears a golden portrait of the King.

Notable recipients 
 William Mackey (1973).
 Lyonpo Jigme Yoser Thinley, Former Prime Minister of Bhutan (2 June 1999).
 Ministry of Health, Royal Government of Bhutan
 Royal Bhutan Airline (Drukair)
 Pawo Choyning Dorji

Sources

Orders, decorations, and medals of Bhutan
Awards established in 1966